Jach'a Ch'ankha (Aymara jach'a big, great, ch'ankha wool cord, "great cord", also spelled Jachcha Chankha) is a  mountain in the Andes in Bolivia. It is located in the Oruro Department, Cercado Province, Paria Municipality (formerly Soracachi), 16 km east of Oruro. Jach'a Ch'ankha lies near the villages of Paya Payani in the northeast, Qala Qala in the south and Irsuma in the southwest.

References 

Mountains of Oruro Department